Malcolm Ivan Waite (May 7, 1892 – April 25, 1949) was an American film actor.

Biography
Malcolm Waite appeared in 31 films between 1923 and 1942, most notably as the oily "ladies' man" Jack in Charlie Chaplin's film classic The Gold Rush; he also appeared in an early Laurel and Hardy comedy, Why Girls Love Sailors. Waite was primarily a dramatic actor, who made only occasional forays into comedy. He was known as The Millionaires Extra, because he lived in the Ambassador Hotel in Los Angeles and was reportedly a member of the high society in New York, London and Paris. He was also an amateur heavyweight boxer. Waite had some good supporting roles in the silent era, but with the beginning of sound films his roles got smaller and he was often uncredited. The actor made his last film in 1942.

Filmography

References

External links

1892 births
1949 deaths
American male film actors
Male actors from Michigan
20th-century American male actors